Wanner is a surname. Notable people with the surname include:

 Florian Wanner (born 1978), German judoka
 Jack Wanner (1885–1919), Major League Baseball player
 Rudolf Wanner (born 1951), Austrian ski jumper
 Zukiswa Wanner (born 1976), South African journalist and novelist